The Anderson orthogonality theorem is a theorem in physics by the physicist P. W. Anderson.

It relates to the introduction of a magnetic impurity in a metal. When a magnetic impurity is introduced into a metal, the conduction electrons will tend to screen the potential  that the impurity creates.

References
 
 

Condensed matter physics